Yaaku (also known as Mukogodo, Mogogodo, Mukoquodo, Siegu, Yaakua, Ndorobo) is an endangered Afroasiatic language spoken in Kenya. It is Cushitic, but its position within that family has been unclear. Bender 2020 [2008] concluded it was Omo–Tana ('Arboroid'). Speakers are all older adults.

Bender (2020) adds Yaaku to the Western Omo–Tana languages, while its classification was previously obscure.

Language situation
The Yaaku people are former hunter-gatherers and bee-keepers.  They adopted the pastoralist culture of the Maasai in the first half of the twentieth century, although some still keep bees. As a result, the Yaaku almost completely gave up their language for the Maa language of the dominant Maasai tribe (including the Samburu) between 1925 and 1936. The variety of Maa they speak is called Mukogodo-Maasai. Old Yaaku words are still found in bee-keeping vocabulary, for example:
 — 'honey' (cf. Maasai en-aisho o lotorrok)
 — 'greater honeyguide (Indicator indicator)' (compare Maasai n-cɛshɔrɔ-î)
 — 'wooden honey container (about 60 cm)'

A language-revival movement has started among the Yaaku in recent years, aiming to strengthen the Yaaku identity. In early 2005, Maarten Mous, Hans Stoks and Matthijs Blonk visited Doldol on the invitation of a special Yaaku committee, to determine whether there is enough knowledge of Yaaku left among the people to revive the language. This visit has shown there are few truly fluent Yaaku speakers left, all very old: two women called Roteti and Yaponay, respectively, and a man called Legunai. The latter two are both of the Terito age set, which means that they must be around a hundred years old. Knowledge of vocabulary is much wider spread in the community. Full language revival is improbable because of the scarcity of fluent speakers, but one of the possibilities for a partial revival is to use Yaaku vocabulary in the framework of Maa grammar, a strategy that is analogous to the making of Mbugu, a mixed language of the Usambara mountains in Tanzania.

Notes

References 
 Brenzinger, Matthias (1992) 'Lexical retention in language shift', in Brenzinger, Matthias (ed.) Language Death: Factual and Theoretical Explorations with Special Reference to East Africa. Berlin/New York: Mouton de Gruyter, 213–254.
 Heine, Bernd (1974/75) 'Notes on the Yaaku language (Kenya)', Afrika und Übersee, 58(1), 27–61; 58(2), 119–138.
 Heine, Bernd & Brenzinger, Matthias (1988) 'Notes on the Mukogodo dialect of Maasai', Afrikanistische Arbeitspapiere, 14, 97–131.
 Mous, Maarten & Stoks, Hans & Blonk, Matthijs (2005) 'De laatste sprekers' [the last speakers], in Indigo, tijdschrift over inheemse volken [journal on indigenous peoples], pp. 9–13.
 Sommer, Gabriele (1992) 'A survey on language death in Africa', in Brenzinger, Matthias (ed.) Language Death: Factual and Theoretical Explorations with Special Reference to East Africa. Berlin/New York: Mouton de Gruyter, 301–417.

External links 
 The last speakers – Yaaku language saved from extinction

Western Omo–Tana languages
Languages of Kenya
Endangered languages of Africa